High Live is a live album released in video and audio formats in 1996 by the German power metal band Helloween. The video was re-released on DVD in 2002 by Sanctuary Records.

Track listing

Disc one

Disc two

Credits 
 Andi Deris - Vocals
 Michael Weikath - Guitars
 Roland Grapow - Guitars
 Markus Grosskopf - Bass
 Uli Kusch - Drums

Charts

References

External links
 Album information from Helloween's official website

Helloween albums
1996 live albums
1996 video albums
Live video albums